Alexis Ricardo Cuello (born 18 February 2000) is an Argentine footballer currently playing as a forward for Racing Club.

Career statistics

Club

Notes

References

2000 births
Living people
Argentine footballers
Association football forwards
Primera Nacional players
Racing Club de Avellaneda footballers
Barracas Central players
Instituto footballers
People from Avellaneda Partido
Sportspeople from Buenos Aires Province